The Essex County Ground (ECG) is a cricket venue in Chelmsford, Essex, England. It has been used by Essex County Cricket Club for first-class cricket since 1925 and List A matches since 1969, and has been the county's official home ground since 1967.
The ground has a capacity of 6,500, mostly in single-tier seating with a single double-tiered stand. Its pavilion was completed in the 1970s.

History
Essex's first match at the ground took place in June 1925 against Oxford University. and their first County Championship game at Chelmsford was against Somerset in 1926. When the club left its headquarters at Leyton Cricket Ground at the end of the 1933 season they began a period of playing games at various venues around the county, with a week allocated to each. Chelmsford was given two weeks a season but poor attendances led to Essex ceasing to play at the ground after 1956. In 1966 the club purchased the Chelmsford ground for £15,000, with some financial assistance from Warwickshire's Supporters Association, and the ground became Essex's headquarters with home matches returning there from the 1967 season. The pavilion was opened during the 1970 season and the permanent scoreboard at the ground was constructed in 1981.

Domestic cricket

Chelmsford is a small ground, and is notoriously difficult to defend a total at in limited overs cricket, demonstrated by the fact that no side has ever defended a score of under 170 in T20 cricket here. Former Essex and England batsman Graham Gooch scored most of his first-class runs there. Graham Napier scored 152 off 58 balls (16 sixes and 10 fours) in a Twenty20 match v Sussex at the ground. The success of Essex County Cricket Club in the shorter versions of the game between 2005 and 2008 led to the attraction of many new fans. Eventually the ground was regularly selling out in Twenty20 and Friends Provident Trophy games.

The Ford Motor Company had naming rights for the ground for between 2005 and 2013.  From 2017 to 2019 the naming rights to the stadium have been bought by Cloudfm and therefore the ground will be known as the Cloudfm County Ground.  The large amount of passionate support Essex receive at this ground has led to it being popularly referred to as 'Fortress Chelmsford'.

International cricket
, the venue has hosted three men's One Day International (ODI) matches. The first ODI was played between Australia and India during the 1983 Cricket World Cup and the last ODI match was played between South Africa and Zimbabwe during the 1999 Cricket World Cup.

Ground redevelopment since 2010
New development to the ground include the building of new apartment blocks, the construction of a new cricket school, public square and an access bridge from the Chelmsford town centre side of the ground. In 2019 the ground's floodlights were replaced by larger, square floodlights.

References

Sources

See also
List of cricket grounds in England and Wales

Cricket grounds in Essex
Essex County Cricket Club
Sport in Chelmsford
Buildings and structures in Chelmsford (city)
1999 Cricket World Cup stadiums
1983 Cricket World Cup stadiums